Fujiwara no Mototoshi (1060–1142) was a waka poet and Japanese nobleman active in the Heian period. One of his poems is included in the Ogura Hyakunin Isshu. He served as Udaijin in the Heian administration.

Mototoshi was the compiler of the anthology Shinsen Rōeishū, and his poems were included in the anthology Kin'yō Wakashū.

External links 
E-text of his poems in Japanese
More info on Fujiwara Mototoshi on the History of Japan Database.

Japanese poets
1060 deaths
1142 deaths
Fujiwara clan
Hyakunin Isshu poets